Steven Ferrey is a contracts and environmental law professor at Suffolk University. He is the author of a contract and environmental law book, entitled Aspen, Examples and Explanations. He received his JD from University of California Berkeley and has been a full-time professor since 1989.

Career
Currently, Ferrey is a Senior Counsel at the National Consumer Law Center as well as a professor at Suffolk University Law School.

He has served as a public member on a White House policy review panel (1978–79); as an advisor to the Office of Technology Assessment of the U.S. Congress; and as a member of the Governor's talk force on hazardous waste for the State of Massachusetts.

Education
Ferrey received his BA from Pomona College and got his MA and JD from the University of California, Berkeley.

Subjects
His subject expertise is in contracts, environmental law, and energy law.

Articles

He has authored the following articles throughout his tenure:
U.S. Carbon Regulation, in CLIMATE CHANGE: A GUIDE TO CARBON LAW AND PRACTICE (Global Law and Business, Paul Watchman ed., 2008)
Renewable and Decentralized Energy Options: State Promotion in the U.S., in ENCYCLOPEDIA OF ENERGY ENGINEERING AND TECHNOLOGY (Barney L. Capehart ed., 2007)
Net Metering, in ENCYCLOPEDIA OF ENERGY ENGINEERING AND TECHNOLOGY (Barney L. Capehart ed., 2007)
Officer and Director Liability for Environmental Law Violations, in MINIMIZING LIABILITY FOR HAZARDOUS WASTE MANAGEMENT. (1998) (with Michael P. Last) (ALI-ABA Course of Study)
Chapter, in ENCYCLOPEDIA OF THE CONSUMER MOVEMENT (1997)
Financing, in IMPLEMENTATION OF SOLAR THERMAL TECHNOLOGY (1997)
Chapter, in 18:1 PUBLIC UTILITIES LAW ANTHOLOGY (1995)
Introduction, in XV (PT 1) PUBLIC UTILITIES LAW ANTHOLOGY (1993)
The Successful Project: The Power Market, Economics and Tax Aspects, in HOT TOPICS IN GOVERNMENT REGULATION (Suffolk Univ. Law School Advanced Legal Studies, 1993)
Chapter, in VENTURE CAPITAL MANUAL (Warren, Gorham & Lamont, 1990) (Lee, ed.)

References

Suffolk University Law School faculty
UC Berkeley School of Law alumni
Living people
Year of birth missing (living people)
Pomona College alumni